Una parte di me is the eighth studio album by Italian singer-songwriter Nek. It was released in 2005. The single "Lascia che io sia..." was one of the best selling single in Italy in 2005, selling 40,000 copies.

Track listing

Musicians 
 Nek – vocals, bass, acoustic guitar, electric guitar, backing vocals
 Cesare Chiodo – bass
 Max Costa – keyboards, percussions
 Gabriele Messori – trumpet
 Emiliano Fantuzzi – electric guitar, acoustic guitar, soloist guitar
 Sandro Allario – accordion
 Alfredo Golino – drums
 Gabriele Cicognani – bass
 Pier Foschi – batteria
 Dado Parisini – organ, keyboards, piano
 Andrea Rosatelli – bass
 Massimo Varini – acoustic guitar, backing vocals, electric guitar, soloist guitar, keyboards

Charts

Weekly charts

Year-end charts

Certifications

References

2005 albums
Nek albums